Vitor Correia da Silva (born 1 August 1996), known as Vitor Feijão is a Brazilian footballer who plays for Kukësi as a forward.

Club career

Paraná
Born in São Paulo, Feijão is a graduate of the youth academy of Paraná. On 16 October 2015, he was called to the senior team for a Série B match against Esporte Clube Vitória; making his debut and replacing Edér in the 1–1 draw.

Deemed surplus to the club's requirements Feijão joined Jacuipense on a loan deal on 2 March 2016. However he returned to his parent club in early April. In May, he was loaned to Série A club Coritiba after having renewed his contract till 2017.

On 9 January 2017, Feijão's contract was extended till the end of the season. In February, he suffered a muscle injury during a game against PSTC and was ruled out of play for 10 months. After recovering from injury, he returned to play in August, scoring a goal against Juventude in a 2–0 win. On 9 September, he signed a contract extension, which would keep him at the club till 2018. At the end of the season, his side was promoted to Série A after 10 years.

In Série A, Feijão found his playing time limited due to the arrival of Léo Itaperuna and Silvinho. Consequently, he joined Criciúma on a loan deal on 30 May 2018.

Ceará
On 18 December 2018, Feijão joined Ceará for the upcoming season. On 7 June 2019 Guarani FC confirmed, that they had loaned Feijão for the rest of the season. In June, he moved to the Belarusian Shakhtar from Soligorsk.

Career statistics

References

External links

1996 births
Living people
Footballers from São Paulo
Brazilian footballers
Association football forwards
Brazilian expatriate footballers
Campeonato Brasileiro Série A players
Campeonato Brasileiro Série B players
Kategoria Superiore players
Paraná Clube players
Esporte Clube Jacuipense players
Coritiba Foot Ball Club players
Criciúma Esporte Clube players
Ceará Sporting Club players
Guarani FC players
Figueirense FC players
Paysandu Sport Club players
Boavista Sport Club players
FK Kukësi players
FC Shakhtyor Soligorsk players
Brazilian expatriate sportspeople in Albania
Expatriate footballers in Albania
Expatriate footballers in Belarus